The 1987 Maryland Terrapins football team represented the University of Maryland in the 1987 NCAA Division I-A football season. In their first season under head coach Joe Krivak, the Terrapins compiled a 4–7 record, finished in fifth place in the Atlantic Coast Conference, and were outscored by their opponents 301 to 194. The team's statistical leaders included Dan Henning with 1,835 passing yards, Bren Lowery with 556 rushing yards, and Azizuddin Abdur-Ra'oof with 617 receiving yards.

Schedule

Roster

Game summaries

at Miami (FL)

References

Maryland
Maryland Terrapins football seasons
Maryland Terrapins football